The 1949–50 SK Rapid Wien season was the 52nd season in club history.

Squad

Squad and statistics

Squad statistics

Fixtures and results

League

References

1949-50 Rapid Wien Season
Rapid